Héctor Sánchez Cabrera (born 31 March 1985), known simply as Héctor, is a Spanish professional footballer who plays for UD Gran Tarajal as a left-back.

Club career
Héctor was born in Puerto del Rosario, Canary Islands. A product of CD Tenerife's youth system, he made his first-team debut in 2004–05 in the Segunda División, then made a further 57 league appearances over the next four seasons, including 19 in 2008–09 to help the club return to La Liga after seven years.

In the following campaign, Héctor made his top-flight debut when he played seven minutes in a 2–1 home win against Sporting de Gijón on 6 December 2009, but featured sparingly overall – seven of his 11 matches came in the last rounds – as his team was immediately relegated.

On 19 June 2011, Héctor signed for Videoton FC in Hungary. Having returned to his country after nearly two years of inactivity, he resumed his career in the lower leagues.

Club statistics

References

External links

Stats at HLSZ 

1985 births
Living people
People from Fuerteventura
Sportspeople from the Province of Las Palmas
Spanish footballers
Footballers from the Canary Islands
Association football defenders
La Liga players
Segunda División players
Segunda División B players
Tercera División players
Tercera Federación players
CD Tenerife B players
CD Tenerife players
Villarreal CF B players
La Roda CF players
SD Amorebieta footballers
Nemzeti Bajnokság I players
Fehérvár FC players
Spanish expatriate footballers
Expatriate footballers in Hungary
Spanish expatriate sportspeople in Hungary